Devonfield Garden is a park in north Liverpool, England. In 2010, it was one of 17 parks in the city to win a Green Flag Award.

References

External links
 Devonfield Garden Liverpool City Council

Parks and commons in Liverpool